Scientific Information Database (SID) of Academic Center for Education, Culture and Research  is an Iranian free accessible website for indexing academic journals and access to full text or metadata of Academic publishing.

Features
Institute for Scientific Information indexed articles

See also 

 List of academic databases and search engines

Notes 

Citation indices
Science and technology in Iran
Official website not in Wikidata
Scholarly search services
Online databases
Bibliographic databases and indexes
Iranian websites
Iranian online encyclopedias